Michael Joel Sklar (July 12, 1944 – March 5, 1984) was an American actor, writer, songwriter, and fashion retailer. He was best known as a Warhol superstar, starring in multiple films by Warhol and Paul Morrissey before his death.

Sklar died of lymphoma at the New York University Medical Center on March 5, 1984, and was survived by his mother, Bertha Sklar, a sister, Carol Wueste, and a brother, Norman Sklar.

Selected filmography
 Trash (1970) - Mr. Michaels
 Women in Revolt (1971) - Max Morris
 Scarecrow in a Garden of Cucumbers (1972) - Noel Airman
 L'Amour (1973) - Michael

References

External links
 

1944 births
1984 deaths
20th-century American male actors
American male film actors
Deaths from lymphoma